Oscar Muñoz Orbos (born January 28, 1951), popularly known as Ka Oca, is a Philippine TV personality and host of GMA Network's Debate with Mare at Pare.

Orbos was a former cabinet secretary, provincial governor, and vice presidential candidate. He is now a practicing lawyer and broadcaster.

Early life

Born in Bani, Pangasinan, he completed his studies at the University of the Philippines with a Bachelor of Arts in Economics in 1971. He enrolled in the University of the Philippines College of Law and received his Bachelor of Laws in 1975.

Private career

He became a legal assistant to the Paredes, Poblador, Nazareno, Azada and Tomacruz Law Firm from 1975 to 1976 and elevated to Associate Attorney  in 1976. He became a Partner in 1980 and the firm was called the Poblador, Azada, Tomacruz, Paredes, Cacanindin and Orbos Law Firm. He resigned to the post in 1983 to help in the propaganda campaign to oust Ferdinand Marcos.

Politics

In 1987, Orbos ran and won as congressman and represented the first district of Pangasinan from November 1987 to December 1989. He was cited as one of the most active congressmen in the 8th Philippine Congress. He was cited as one of the 1989 Ten Outstanding Young Men (TOYM) for Public Service and legislation.

On January 4, 1990, President Corazon Aquino appointed him as secretary of the Department of Transportation and Communications. As secretary, one of the most notable contributions was the yellow lane, where the two outermost lanes of 4-6 lane roads were allotted for public utility vehicles, mostly buses. He also facilitated the approval of cellular broadcast. This made it possible for companies to offer a new form of communication more popularly known as "cellular phones".

On December 21, 1990, Orbos was appointed by Aquino as her executive secretary. During that time, Iraq already occupied Kuwait and it had plans to make further attacks on Saudi Arabia. Orbos facilitated measures for the repatriation and communication to overseas Filipino workers working in the Middle East.

He resigned on July 5, 1991 and returned to private life. He co-hosted GMA Network's Firing Line, a TV panel talk show with Teodoro Benigno, Mrs. Aquino's former press secretary. During the 1992 elections, he actively supported fellow Pangasinense Fidel Ramos to the presidency.

In 1995, he resigned as host of the TV program and ran for the position of Governor of Pangasinan. He won the election via landslide. As governor, he initiated the establishment of a Provincial Action Center to provide public direct access to all provincial and national government offices to respond to needs of his constituency. Orbos gained the highest public approval rating as governor.

Orbos served as the Governor of Pangasinan until 1998 and did not seek a reelection. He instead ran in the 1998 elections for the position of Vice President as a running mate of Renato de Villa. However, he lost to Senator Gloria Macapagal Arroyo.

Debate Host

In late 1998, Orbos was offered by Menardo Jimenez, president of GMA Network to host an open debate program for TV. Jimenez is a native of Dasol, located in the first district of Pangasinan. As a good friend, he gladly accepted the offer and was paired with Economics professor Solita Monsod, known as "Mareng Winnie." Debate with Mare at Pare became a phenomenal interactive and open talk show in the Philippines. The talk show was the only latetime TV program earning a high audience rating.

Despite offers to enter again to public office, he refuse so because he already called his current job "political". He earned the respect of the public for being neutral on most issues.

Private life

His brother, Fr. Jerry Orbos, SVD, is a popular priest who regularly appears in Sunday TV healing masses. Fr. Orbos holds office in Christ the King Mission Seminary in Quezon City. His other brother, Thomas Orbos, was appointed acting chairman and General Manager of the Metropolitan Manila Development Authority by President Rodrigo Duterte.

His co-host, Professor Solita Monsod, was his godmother during his wedding.

Awards and nominations

References

External links
GMA Network's Debate with Mare and Pare
GMA Network's Debate with Mare and Pare Internet voting

Living people
20th-century Filipino lawyers
Governors of Pangasinan
People from Pangasinan
University of the Philippines alumni
Members of the House of Representatives of the Philippines from Pangasinan
Executive Secretaries of the Philippines
Secretaries of Transportation of the Philippines
Partido para sa Demokratikong Reporma politicians
Candidates in the 1998 Philippine vice-presidential election
Filipino television presenters
1951 births
Corazon Aquino administration cabinet members
GMA Network personalities
GMA Integrated News and Public Affairs people
21st-century Filipino lawyers